Mohammed Saleh Ali Al-Musalami (born 20 April 1990), commonly known as Mohammed Al-Musalami, is an Omani footballer who plays as a centre back for Al Gharafa.

Club career
On 17 July 2013, he agreed a one-year contract extension with 2012–13 Oman Elite League runners-up Fanja SC. On 2 July 2014, he agreed a one-year contract extension with Fanja SC.

In September 2021, he joined Qatar Stars League club Al-Gharafa.

Club career statistics

International career
Mohammed is part of the first team squad of the Oman national football team. He was selected for the national team for the first time in 2010. He made his first appearance for Oman on 11 September 2012 in a friendly match against Ireland. He has made appearances in the 2014 FIFA World Cup qualification, the 2013 Gulf Cup of Nations, 2015 AFC Asian Cup qualification and the 2014 Gulf Cup of Nations and has represented the national team in the 2011 AFC Asian Cup qualification.

National team career statistics

Goals for Senior National Team
Scores and results list Oman's goal tally first.

Honours

Club
With Saham
Sultan Qaboos Cup (1): 2009
Oman Super Cup (1): 2010

With Al-Shabab
Oman Elite League (0): Runner-Up 2011–12

With Fanja
Oman Professional League (0): Runner-Up 2012–13, 2013-14
Sultan Qaboos Cup (1): 2013-14
Oman Professional League Cup (1): 2014-15
Oman Super Cup (1): 2012; Runner-Up 2013, 2014

References

External links
 
 
 Mohammed Al-Musalami at Goal.com
 
 
 Mohammed Al-Musalami - ASIAN CUP Australia 2015

1990 births
Living people
Omani footballers
Omani expatriate footballers
Oman international footballers
Association football defenders
2015 AFC Asian Cup players
Saham SC players
Al-Shabab SC (Seeb) players
Fanja SC players
Al Jazira Club players
Dhofar Club players
Al-Gharafa SC players
Oman Professional League players
UAE Pro League players
Qatar Stars League players
Footballers at the 2010 Asian Games
2019 AFC Asian Cup players
Asian Games competitors for Oman
Expatriate footballers in the United Arab Emirates
Expatriate footballers in Qatar
Omani expatriate sportspeople in the United Arab Emirates
Omani expatriate sportspeople in Qatar